Savo Railway Museum is a museum located in Pieksämäki, Finland. It presents the history of rail transport. The building was completed in 1889, and the museum opened to the public in 1989.

References

External links
 Official site

Railway museums in Finland